Andrey Ditzel (born February 14, 1977, Novosibirsk) is a Russian prose writer, poet, journalist and LGBT activist.

Biography 
Born in Novosibirsk on February 14, 1977. Graduate of the Siberian Academy of Public Administration with a degree in Public Relations, Licentiate in the Humanities Faculty of the University of Hamburg.

In the fall of 2001, he entered into a civil partnership with his partner in Germany. The first ever registration of a same-sex union of two Russian citizens caused a discussion in the electronic and print media.

Since 2002 he has been living and working in Germany. He is known as one of the organizers of the Russian-speaking column at the gay pride parade in Berlin [5]. Member of the German Union of Journalists BDFJ.

Repeatedly entered the short lists of the literary competition named after NS Gumilyov "The Lost Tram" , the project "Eshkol: Contemporary Israeli and Jewish Culture in Russia"  and other competitions. Winner (2010) of the Russian-language poetic slam in Berlin , the international poetry competition "Emigrant Lyre 2014 \ 2015".

In May 2013, Dietzel's photo exhibition “Water Earth” was opened in the Novosibirsk City Center of Fine Arts as part of the Russian-Italian Museum Night.

Publications 
 The pier. Poems - St. Petersburg: Helikon Plus, 2001.
 Fingers. Poems. - Novosibirsk: Artel "Wasted Labor", 2003.
 G. Vlasov, A. Ditzel, K. Shcherbino, E. Zhumagulov. Moscow cuisine: Collection of poems. Foreword: S. Arutyunov. Afterword: D. Isakzhanov. - SPb: Helikon, 2005.
 SLAVISTIKA: Poems, diaries, stories. - SPb .: Artel "Wasted Labor", 2007
 Centaur vs Satyr. - Tver: KOLONNA Publications, 2009.
 Water Earth. Collection of poems. - Novosibirsk: "Left Bank", 2013.

References 

German journalists
Russian LGBT rights activists
1977 births
Living people